Marcus T. Cicerone is an American physicist, focusing in noninvasive spectroscopic imaging, currently at Georgia Tech and an Elected Fellow of the American Physical Society.

References

Year of birth missing (living people)
Living people
21st-century American physicists
Place of birth missing (living people)
Fellows of the American Physical Society